Springfield is a rural locality in the local government areas of Launceston and Dorset, in the Launceston and North-east regions of Tasmania. The 2016 census determined a population of 188 for the state suburb of Springfield.

History
The name Springfield was used for the area from 1876. It was gazetted as a locality in 1964.

Geography
St Patricks River forms part of the southern boundary.

Road infrastructure
The Tasman Highway (A3) passes through from south-west to north. The C406 route (South Springfield Road) starts at an intersection with A3 in the north and runs south-east before exiting. The C407 route (Ten Mile Track) starts at an intersection with A3 in the centre and exits to the north-east. The C830 route (Sledge Track) starts at an intersection with A3 in the centre and runs north before exiting to the north-west.

References

Localities of City of Launceston
Localities of Dorset Council (Australia)
Towns in Tasmania